Luiz Henrique Alves Angelo (born 7 January 1996), commonly known as Luizinho, is a Brazilian footballer who plays for Ituano FC as an attacking midfielder.

Club career
Born in São Paulo, Luizinho graduated from Ponte Preta's youth setup. On 1 December 2013 he made his first team – and Série A – debut, replacing William in the 76th minute of a 0–2 home loss against Portuguesa.

In 2014 Luizinho moved to Granada CF, being assigned to the Juvenil squad. In July he was promoted to the reserves in Segunda División B.

On 18 January 2016, Luizinho was loaned to fellow third-tier club Linares Deportivo, until June. On 20 July, he moved to Sport Club Atibaia in his homeland, also in a temporary deal.

References

External links

1996 births
Living people
Footballers from São Paulo
Brazilian footballers
Association football midfielders
Campeonato Brasileiro Série A players
Campeonato Brasileiro Série D players
Segunda División B players
Associação Atlética Ponte Preta players
Associação Portuguesa de Desportos players
Sport Club Atibaia players
Ituano FC players
Club Recreativo Granada players
Brazilian expatriate footballers
Expatriate footballers in Spain
Brazilian expatriate sportspeople in Spain